Five Articles may refer to:

Five Articles of Perth, 1618
Five Articles of Remonstrance, 1610